The code of non-infringement (or "the Code") is the accepted business practice and custom among certain performance artists, particularly clowns, that an artist's unique performance attributes are proprietary and cannot be used or claimed by another. Among clowns, these attributes may include stage names, costume elements, facial designs, and clown's specific jokes or "gags" and "bits".

See also
Intellectual rights to magic methods

Clowning
Intellectual property law